Suwarna (Nepali: सुवर्ण ) is a rural municipality in Bara District in Province No. 2 of Nepal. It was formed in 2016 occupying current 8 sections (wards) from previous 8 former VDCs. It occupies an area of 36.84 km2 with a total population of 29,602.

References 

Populated places in Bara District
Rural municipalities of Nepal established in 2017
Rural municipalities in Madhesh Province